Sarantaporos (Greek: Σαραντάπορος) may refer to several rivers in Greece:

Sarantaporos (Epirus), a tributary to the Aoos in Epirus
Sarantaporos (Thessaly), a tributary to the Titarisios in Thessaly

See also

Sarantaporo
Battle of Sarantaporo